Olamide Toyin Adebayo (born 22 June 1976), is a Nigerian badminton player. Adebayo won gold medal in the women's doubles category at the 1996 African Championships, which took place in Lagos, Nigeria.

Career 
In 1995, Adebayo first won her major international tournament in her home country, during the Nigeria International Badminton Championships in Abuja, in the women's doubles event partnered with Obiageli Olorunsola. She also competed at the 1995 and 1999 IBF World Championships.

Achievements

African Championships 
Women's singles

Women's doubles

Mixed doubles

IBF International 
Women's singles

Women's doubles

Mixed doubles

References

External links 
 

1976 births
Living people
Nigerian female badminton players
Yoruba sportswomen
20th-century Nigerian women